Maarten Neyens (born 1 March 1985) is a professional Belgian road cyclist, who last rode for .

Palmarès

2008
 2nd I.W.T. Jong Maar Moedig
2009
 2nd Beverbeek Classic
 2nd Profronde van Fryslan
 10th Dutch Food Valley Classic
 4th Druivenkoers Overijse
2010
 5th De Vlaamse Pijl
2013
 10th Heistse Pijl

References

External links

Maarten Neyens profile at Omega Pharma-Lotto

1985 births
Living people
Belgian male cyclists
People from Brasschaat
Cyclists from Antwerp Province